Hormathophylla is a genus of flowering plants in the family Brassicaceae, native to the western Mediterranean; Morocco, Algeria, Spain, France and Italy. Perennial shrubs, they are adapted to dry, alkaline soils with high levels of magnesium.

Species
Currently accepted species include:

Hormathophylla cadevalliana (Pau) T.R.Dudley
Hormathophylla cochleata (Coss. & Durieu) P.Küpfer
Hormathophylla halimifolia (Boiss.) P.Küpfer
Hormathophylla lapeyrouseana (Jord.) P.Küpfer
Hormathophylla longicaulis (Boiss.) Cullen & T.R.Dudley
Hormathophylla purpurea (Lag. & Rodr.) P.Küpfer
Hormathophylla pyrenaica (Lapeyr.) Cullen & T.R.Dudley
Hormathophylla reverchonii (Degen & Hervier) Cullen & T.R.Dudley
Hormathophylla saxigena (Jord. & Fourr.) D.A.German & Govaerts
Hormathophylla spinosa (L.) P.Küpfer

References

Brassicaceae
Brassicaceae genera